Grande America was a roll-on/roll-off cargo ship built by Fincantieri in 1997, owned and operated by Grimaldi Lines, a subsidiary of Grimaldi Group. It sank in the Bay of Biscay in March 2019.

Sinking

On 10 March 2019, Grande America caught fire while traveling the Atlantic Ocean between France and Spain on its route from Hamburg (Germany) to Casablanca (Morocco), and sank  into the Bay of Biscay on 12 March. The 27 people on board were rescued by the Royal Navy ship  after they abandoned ship on 11 March. After their lifeboat's engine broke down entering the water, a Royal Navy sea boat towed it to safety in a  swell. Leading Seaman David Groves, the sea boat coxswain, was later awarded the Queen's Gallantry Medal for his bravery in the rescue.

Oil spill

The ship was carrying 365 containers, of which 45 contained material deemed to be hazardous, including 10 tonnes of hydrochloric acid and 70 tonnes of sulfuric acid.

The ship contained dozens of vehicles that were to be delivered to Brazilian importers, including 37 Porsche vehicles. Four of these were Porsche's last units of the 911 GT2 RS, which went out of production in February 2019. The sinking led to Porsche reactivating the production line for the Porsche 911 GT2 RS, so that these four last units could be delivered to their owners in Brazil. The ship was also transporting dozens of Audi cars, including RS4 and RS5 models.

The wreck was located by Island Pride (a vessel leased to Ocean Infinity). It arrived 30 March and started inspecting the wreck site using remotely operated underwater vehicles (ROVs). The  ROVs were used to seal light leaks of oil discovered during the inspection.

See also
 List of roll-on/roll-off vessel accidents
 Grimaldi Group

References

External links

Cargo ships
Ro-ro ships
Grimaldi Group
Shipwrecks
Oil spills in France
Maritime incidents in 2019
Ships sunk with no fatalities
Bay of Biscay
Ships built by Fincantieri
1997 ships
2019 disasters in France